Józef Pawłowski (born 29 August 1990) is a Polish actor. He has appeared in more than ten films since 2011.

Biography
Józef is the grandson of Jerzy Pawlowski and actress Teresa Szmigielówny. His older brother, Stefan is also an actor.

Selected filmography

References

External links 

1990 births
Living people
Polish male film actors